Parvidrilus is a genus of annelids belonging to the monotypic family Parvidrilidae.

The species of this genus are found in Europe.

Species:

Parvidrilus camachoi 
Parvidrilus gianii 
Parvidrilus gineti 
Parvidrilus jugeti 
Parvidrilus meyssonnieri 
Parvidrilus spelaeus 
Parvidrilus stochi 
Parvidrilus strayeri 
Parvidrilus tomasini

References

Clitellata
Annelid genera
Taxa named by Christer Erséus